The 2014 New Zealand Derby was a horse race which took place at Ellerslie Racecourse on Saturday 1 March 2014. It was the 139th running of the New Zealand Derby, and it was won by Puccini.

Puccini was the favourite for the race on the strength of impressive victories in the Great Northern Guineas, Waikato Guineas and Avondale Guineas. He showed a distinct fondness for front-running tactics in these victories, leading throughout and scoring emphatic victories. The same tactics were widely expected to be repeated in the Derby. But Puccini was slow out of the gates and was fourth last in the 18-horse field after the first 500m. He made a spectacular move halfway down the back stretch, sweeping to the lead. He kicked strongly at the turn and held on for an impressive and convincing two-length win over Rising Romance, with Glorious Lad another four lengths away in third.

Puccini's spectacular performance received a rapturous reception from the Ellerslie crowd, and prompted rider Michael Walker to declare that Puccini was the best horse he'd ever ridden.

Rising Romance made up ground from near the back of the field to finish second. She is by the same sire and trained by the same stable as 2013 Derby winner Habibi. Glorious Lad took third.

Race details
 Sponsor: TV3
 Prize money: NZ$750,000
 Track: Good
 Number of runners: 18
 Winner's time: 2:28.39

Full result

Winner's details
Further details of the winner, Puccini:

 Foaled: 25 September 2010 in New Zealand
 Sire: Encosta De Lago; Dam: Miss Opera (Paris Opera)
 Owner: Monovale Farm
 Trainer: Peter & Jacob McKay
 Breeder: Monovale Farm
 Starts: 14
 Wins: 5
 Seconds: 1
 Thirds: 3
 Earnings: $676,925

The road to the Derby
Early-season appearances in 2013–14 prior to running in the Derby.

 Puccini – 4th New Zealand 2000 Guineas, 1st Great Northern Guineas, 4th Levin Classic, 1st Waikato Guineas, 1st Avondale Guineas
 Rising Romance – 1st Trevor Eagle Memorial, 3rd Eight Carat Classic, 1st Royal Stakes, 2nd Avondale Guineas
 Glorious Lad – 2nd Wellington Stakes, 4th Waikato Guineas, 3rd Avondale Guineas
 Kentucky Son – 4th Trevor Eagle Memorial, 9th Great Northern Guineas, 15th Waikato Guineas, 15th Avondale Guineas
 We'regoingtogetcha – 8th New Zealand 2000 Guineas, 8th Levin Classic, 3rd Waikato Guineas
 Fast Dragon – 3rd Trevor Eagle Memorial, 4th Championship Stakes, 3rd Karaka Mile, 6th Avondale Guineas
 Chipandchase – 8th Championship Stakes, 10th Karaka Mile
 Maygrove – 9th Championship Stakes
 Blizzard – 2nd Championship Stakes, 6th Waikato Guineas, 7th Avondale Guineas
 Thorn Pass – 7th Levin Classic, 10th Avondale Guineas
 Lucky Feather – 3rd Wellington Guineas, 3rd Wellington Stakes, 10th Levin Classic, 4th Avondale Guineas
 The Fire Inside – 7th Eulogy Stakes, 3rd Sir Tristram Fillies' Classic
 Colonel Carrera – 13th Great Northern Guineas, 5th Championship Stakes, 2nd Waikato Guineas, 11th Avondale Guineas
 Spellbinder – 2nd Sarten Memorial, 3rd New Zealand 1000 Guineas, 1st Karaka Mile, 2nd Sir Tristram Fillies' Classic
 Habitual Offender – 6th Great Northern Guineas
 King Savinsky – 6th Trevor Eagle Memorial, 10th Waikato Guineas
 Stand Your Ground – No stakes races
 Mr Frankey – No stakes races

Subsequent Group 1 wins
Subsequent wins at Group 1 level by runners in the 2014 New Zealand Derby.

 Rising Romance – Australian Oaks
 Puccini – Thorndon Mile

See also

 2019 New Zealand Derby
 2018 New Zealand Derby
 2017 New Zealand Derby
 2016 New Zealand Derby
 2015 New Zealand Derby
 2013 New Zealand Derby
 2012 New Zealand Derby
 2011 New Zealand Derby
 2010 New Zealand Derby
 Recent winners of major NZ 3 year old races
 Desert Gold Stakes
 Hawke's Bay Guineas
 Karaka Million
 Levin Classic
 New Zealand 1000 Guineas
 New Zealand 2000 Guineas
 New Zealand Oaks

References

New Zealand Derby
2014 in New Zealand sport
New Zealand Derby
March 2014 sports events in New Zealand